Schweber is a surname. People with that name include:

 Samuel Schweber (1936–2017), Argentine chess player
 Silvan S. Schweber (1928–2017), French-born American theoretical physicist and science historian
 Simone Schweber, Goodman Professor of Education and Jewish Studies at the University of Wisconsin–Madison

See also